Russia has the largest video games market in Europe, with an estimated 65.2 million players nationwide as of 2018. Even though piracy has been a great issue in the Russian gaming industry,
the games market more than doubled in the past five years to over $2 billion in 2019.

In 2001, Russia became the first country in the world to officially recognize competitive video gaming (eSports) as a sport.

History

The history of mass videogaming in Russia (back then in the Soviet Union) takes its roots in the early 1980s when personal computers of different models (Atari 400/800, Commodore 64, ZX Spectrum 48/128) were brought to the country from United States, Europe, Japan and China. At the same time, a local company, Electronika, released a series of portable game consoles which were mostly clones of Nintendo products. By the middle of the 80s Soviet programmers and enthusiasts began to try to develop their own games. The most famous Russian game designer of that era is Alexey Pajitnov, who created the worldwide megahit Tetris.

The Dendy, a Taiwanese hardware clone (Famiclone) of the Famicom (Nintendo Entertainment System), was released for the Russian market in 1992. By 1994, over one million Dendy units were sold in Russia. The Dendy went on to sell a total of  units in Russia and other post-Soviet states.

In 2010, Ministry of Communications and Mass Media of Russia encouraged local video game companies to make video games that were patriotic as it was felt foreign video game publishers made games that were anti-Russian.

Arcades

The first Soviet arcade game machines did not contain digital graphics, and the games' interface had to be emulated with help of physical objects.

Russian game developers

Defunct video game developers in Russia

Video game publishers in Russia

<div style=display:inline-table>

Defunct game publishers from Russia

<div style=display:inline-table>

Demographics and popularity

One in 5 Russians self report that they play video games, according to the Moscow Times. Video games enjoy mass appeal in Russia. Males make up 58% and females 42% of gamers. Russians tend to be impulse buyers. According to Newzoo 60% of PC gamers are male and 46% of mobile gamers are female.

According to J'son and Partners Consulting, the biggest growth in gaming in Russia was mobile and PC games in 2016.

Notes

References 

 
Russian games